Senator Hogue may refer to:

Bob Hogue (born 1953), Hawaii State Senate
David P. Hogue (1815–1871), Florida State Senate
David Hogue (born 1962), North Dakota State Senate

See also
John Hoge (1760–1824), Pennsylvania State Senate
Senator Hogg (disambiguation)